Yinchuan Township is a township under the administration of Jishishan Bonan, Dongxiang and Salar Autonomous County, Gansu, China. , it has 12 villages under its administration.

References 

Township-level divisions of Gansu
Jishishan Bonan, Dongxiang and Salar Autonomous County